SLCU can refer to:

 Snow Leopard Commando Unit, a special police unit in China
 School of Law, Christ University in India
 Sainsbury Laboratory University of Cambridge in the United Kingdom